Andrews Peak is a mountain of Antarctica.

Andrews Peak may also refer to:

Andrews Peak (Tuolumne County, California)

See also
Andrews Peaks
Mount Andrews